Uma Charan Patnaik (1902-1961) was an Indian politician. He was elected to the Lok Sabha, the lower house of the Parliament of India as an Independent.

References

External links
Official biographical sketch in Parliament of India website

1902 births
1961 deaths
Lok Sabha members from Odisha
India MPs 1952–1957
India MPs 1957–1962
Indian National Congress politicians from Odisha